KNB can refer to
 KNB EFX Group, an American special effects company
 Kanab Municipal Airport, an airport near Kanab, Utah
 Kitanihon Broadcasting, a Japanese media company
 National Security Committee of the Republic of Kazakhstan, also referred to as the NSC or KNB
 Kalaallit Nunaanni Brugseni, an Greenlandic supermarket chain better known as Brugseni